Chak No. 18 is a village located  from Lahore, the provincial capital of Punjab, Pakistan.   Its another Real and old name is that of Rakh Mundy Ki Khurad. Chak18 is near the Changa Manga wildlife park. The economy is based on agriculture. It was settled in British India in 1906 on the bank of a canal.

Syeds

The majority of Syeds in Chak No. 18 belong to the Mashhadi tribe, which migrated from Iran. The tribes live in the village and specific colonies have been assigned to each tribe. Imam bargah Qasar e Fatima and shrine of Baba Said is in Chak No. 18. It is one few villages in District Kasur which have a substantial Shia community. Baba Syed Dildar Hussain Shah also donated 2 acres of land for hospital for the people of area. His grandson Dr Noman Mashhadi is running a free dispensary in town.

References

Punjab, Pakistan
Villages in Pakistan